Robert Clauws (2 April 1905 – 1 January 1984) was a Belgian racing cyclist. He rode in the 1929 Tour de France.

References

1905 births
1984 deaths
Belgian male cyclists
Place of birth missing